Hermann Erben (15 November 1897 – 1985) was an Austrian physician who served in the German military intelligence, often assuming the title "Doctor".

He joined the Nazi Party in 1938. In 1946, he confessed to a US Military Confession in Shanghai that he had worked for the Ehrhardt Bureau of the Abwehr (German Military Intelligence) from 1941 to 1945 and that he had been a spy inside an internment camp in the far east for over two years.

At one time, the American security service regarded him as one of the three most dangerous operatives in Mexico. He was a friend of Errol Flynn, though no evidence was ever produced that Flynn knew that Erben was a Nazi spy.

References

Sources
 Rudolf Stoiber, 'Der Spion der Hitler sein wollte - Das Leben des Dr. med. Hermann F. Erben' Zsolnay Verlag, Hamburg, 1989

1897 births
1985 deaths
20th-century Austrian physicians
German military officers
Place of birth missing
Place of death missing
Date of death missing
Austrian spies
Abwehr personnel of World War II